Chazumba Mixtec is a Mixtec language of Puebla and Oaxaca, spoken in the towns of Santiago Chazumba, San Pedro y San Pablo Tequixtepec, Zapotitlán, Santa Gertrudis Cosoltepec, Petlalcingo (which it shares with Southern Puebla Mixtec), and Totoltepec de Guerrero.

References 

Mixtec language